Jaromír Bohačík (born 26 May 1992) is a Czech basketball player for Brose Bamberg of the Basketball Bundesliga. He also represents the Czech Republic national team.

National team career
Bohačík represented the Czech Republic national team at the EuroBasket 2017, and the 2019 FIBA World Cup.

References

1992 births
Living people
2019 FIBA Basketball World Cup players
Basketball Nymburk players
Basketball players at the 2020 Summer Olympics
Brose Bamberg players
Czech men's basketball players
Czech expatriate basketball people in Belgium
Olympic basketball players of the Czech Republic
Shooting guards
SIG Basket players
Sportspeople from Ostrava
Czech expatriate basketball people in Germany
Czech expatriate basketball people in France